Nedeljko Bajić (born 9 June 1968), known as Baja, is a Serbian pop-folk singer.

Personal life
Bajić was born into a Bosnian-Serb family in Šipovo, near Jajce in SR Bosnia and Herzegovina, Yugoslavia, and was brought up with two brothers and two sisters. His father died in his early childhood. He moved to Serbia in 1988, and lived in Novi Sad until 1999, when he moved to Belgrade, where he currently lives. Since 1991 he has also lived at times in Austria.

Discography
Vreme briše sve (1992)
Eh Neno Neno (1994)
Usijanje (1996)
Ljubavnik (1997)
Čežnja strast i mržnja (1998)
Svetski čovek (1999)
Došlo vreme (2002)
Koktel ljubavi (2004)
Zapisano u vremenu (2007)
Album dragih uspomena (2010)
Snovi od stakla (2014)

External links
Official Website

1968 births
Living people
People from Šipovo
Yugoslav male singers
20th-century Serbian male singers
Serbian turbo-folk singers
20th-century Bosnia and Herzegovina male singers
Bosnia and Herzegovina turbo-folk singers
Bosnia and Herzegovina folk-pop singers
Bosnia and Herzegovina emigrants to Serbia
21st-century Serbian male singers
Serbs of Bosnia and Herzegovina